In biochemistry, a protein trimer is a macromolecular complex formed by three, usually non-covalently bound, macromolecules like proteins or nucleic acids. A homotrimer would be formed by three identical molecules. A heterotrimer would be formed by three different macromolecules. Type II Collagen is an example of homotrimeric protein, while Type I collagen is an AAB-type heterotrimeric protein.

Porins usually arrange themselves in membranes as trimers.

Bacteriophage T4 tail fiber

Multiple copies of a polypeptide encoded by a gene often can form an aggregate referred to as a multimer.  When a multimer is formed from polypeptides produced by two different mutant alleles of a particular gene, the mixed multimer may exhibit greater functional activity than the unmixed multimers formed by each of the mutants alone.  When a mixed multimer displays increased functionality relative to the unmixed multimers, the phenomenon is referred to as intragenic complementation.  The distal portion of each of the bacteriophage T4 tail fibers is encoded by gene 37 and mutants defective in this gene undergo intragenic complementation.  This finding indicated that the distal tail fibers are a multimer of the gene 37 encoded polypeptide. An analysis of the complementation data further indicated that the polypeptides making up the multimer were folded back on themselves in the form of a hairpin.  A further high-resolution crystal structure analysis of the distal tail fiber indicated that the gene 37 polypeptides are present as a trimer and that each polypeptide of the trimer is folded back on itself in a hairpin configuration.

See also
 Oligomer
 Protein quaternary structure
 Trimer (chemistry)

References

Protein structure
Protein complexes